Jarabacoa is a town located in the central region of the Dominican Republic. It is the second largest municipality in La Vega Province.

History 

The indigenous Taino people originally inhabited the valley of Jarabacoa. It is assumed that the town's name was formed out of the words 'Jaraba' and 'Coa', meaning "Land of Waters" in the Taíno language. The Spanish conquistadors made it to Jarabacoa in their search for gold, but later abandoned the expedition due to violent resistance by the natives in the area, to this day gold can be washed from some of the many rivers. Jarabacoa most likely belonged to the Chiefdom of Maguana making it part of the kingdom of Cibao.

During the colonization period, the Spaniards settled in Jarabacoa working in mines and later established some cattle herds. At the end of the 1700s there were several Spanish families living in Jarabacoa. The area experienced its greatest population growth at the beginning of the 1800s from whites who migrated from other parts of the island after the slave revolts in the French colony of St. Domingue. It had a population boom in 1805 as many landowners came to the area in the mountains of the Central Range and settled in the valley of Jarabacoa.

In 1854, a military post was established and the town was formally founded due to its strategic position in the communication between the Cibao and the South. On September 27, 1858, the town was incorporated as a municipality. Its inhabitants stood out as brilliant soldiers in the Dominican war against Haiti. Such are the cases of General José Durán and also General Norberto Tiburcio.

Four years later, Jarabacoa was elevated to the category of Common by decree of President Pedro Santana, on September 27, 1858, and by Royal Order of the Spanish Ministry of War dated June 26, 1862, the Jarabacoa Military Command was created.

Nowadays Jarabacoa is known to attract many European families, especially retirees. Some notable people as former President Hipólito Mejía or the two locally notable Valerio and Sanchez families currently reside in the city.

Geography and climate

Jarabacoa has a Tropical rainforest climate (Köppen climate classification Af ). Due to its tropical location and high elevation (about 525m above sea level), it has warm days and mild nights during most of the year, and temperate days and cool nights during a few winter months. Because of its mild temperatures, visitors have christened Jarabacoa as "The City of Everlasting Spring."

One of the main touristic attractions is the mountains and natural environment of the area due to its location in the center of the Central Range. It is also one of the main access to the Pico Duarte and the Ebano Verde Scientific Reserve. Jarabacoa has three large rivers, Baiguate, Jimenoa and the Yaque del Norte, the last two merge in the Confluencia, continuing on as the Yaque del Norte, the second largest river in the country.

The coldest temperature ever recorded was 7.1 °C (44.8 °F), on 24 February 2012.

Economy 

The local economy is based upon agriculture. It is known for its strawberries, coffee, pimento and ají pepper, the last two being grown in green houses. Jarabacoa it is also known for its wide variety of flowers.

Places of interest

 Rancho Olivier Bed and Breakfast. Historic Hotel since 1976. Olivier Family Owner. 
 Thevenin Centro Canino Integral. Dachshund Kennel and Cocker Spaniel is a Beautiful Family Place.
 The forestry college "Universidad Agroforestal Fernando Arturo de Marino"  http://uafam.edu.do/
 Colegio Salesiano, a salesian school with soccer and baseball fields, volleyball and basketball courts, academy, parroquial school, retreat center, medical dispensary.
 St. Mary of the Gospel Monastery (Monasterio de Santa María del Evangelio), Cistercian Monastery.
 Jimenoa Waterfalls, Baiguate Waterfall, Constanza Valley, Ébano Verde Scientific Reserve.
 Wooden footbridge over the Jimenoa river, impressive rope and wood construction. Crossing is recommended for those who enjoy extreme sports.
 Jarabacoa Mountain Village.
 Jamaca De Dios, restaurant and housing development.
 Jarabacoa Golf Club, 9-hole golf course.
 Escuela Caribe, The facility shown in "Kidnapped for Christ".

Culture 

The local Carnival in February is one of the most famous in the country. The official website of the Carnival is www.carnavalJarabacoa.com own by magnate Joselito Genao who was born in Jarabacoa, current President/CEO of GENAO'S NETWORK®. On July 16 is celebrated the day of Our Lady of Mount Carmen.
Every June, "Festival de las Flores" is held in Jarabacoa with many local vendors selling flowers, flowering plants and orchids, as well as hand-made crafts.

Education 
On January 10, 1997, opened the Universidad Agroforestal Fernando Arturo de Meriño, a small college that mainly offers majors related to agriculture and ecology. There is also the Eugenio de Jesús Marcano Ecological Centre.

Notable people 
General Daniel Batista y Rodríguez - Comandante del Ejército del Norte, Héroe y Prócer de la Restauración. 
General Rafael Ureña Tiburcio  - General de combate, Héroe de la fuerza aérea dominicana.
General Norberto Tiburcio - General de Brigada, Héroe de la Restauración.
General José Durán - General de Brigada, Héroe de la Restauración.
Obdulio Jiménez (Don Lulo) - Empresario y Pionero de la industria energética local.
 Mario Nelson Galán Durán- Guerrillero. 
Jonathan Delgado - Diplomático 
Kelvin Sanchez - Empresario 
Huascar Dionisio Rodríguez Herrera- Empresario, Filántropo.
Rhina Espaillat, Dominican-American poet.
Avelino Abreu - Empresario.
Daniel Batista (Don Pimienta)- Empresario, Filántropo.
Miguel Maria Castillo-Empresario, Filántropo.
Carlos “Moreno” Valerio - Empresario
Guillermo Moreta - Empresario 
Clodomiro Castillo Durán (Don Mirito)- Empresario, Filántropo.
Juan Pablo Sierra (Don Negro) - Empresario, Filántropo.
Euclides Genao - Empresario, Filántropo.
Rogelio Genao (Don Rogelio) - Empresario, Filántropo.
Francisco Jiménez (Don Neno) - Empresario, Filántropo.
Belarminio Ramírez - Empresario, Filántropo. 
Víctor Manuel Ramírez (Nelito).(1930-2006)- Poeta, Investigador y Empresario. 
Ángela Hernández Núñez - Poetisa y Narradora, miembro de la Academia Dominicana de la Lengua.
Rafael Vinicio Herrera - Sociólogo, músico e investigador, author del primer libro sobre la historia de Jarabacoa.
Julio Cesar Matias (Pololo) - Humorista, Actor y Locutor 
Jean Girigori - Pintora 
Oscar Mejía Abreu (1978)- Deportista.  
Taty Hernández Durán, Poeta y gestora cultural. Creadora del Festival de Poesía en la Montaña.
Jose Amado De Los Santos, "Tití" - Político extinto y constructor.
Dr. Félix Antonio Cruz Jiminián - Médico Filántropo.
Dr. Luis Thevenin Artista Plástico, Escritor, Voice Teacher.
 Ana Celia Fernández de Sierra - Fundadora del Patronato de Damas Bomberos de Jarabacoa, Filántropa.

References

External links

 Salesian Jarabacoa
 Jarabacoa Dominican Republic
 first jarabacoa's dailynews Jarabacoa Digital

Populated places in La Vega Province
Municipalities of the Dominican Republic